Kyūjōmae Station (球場前駅, literally "in front of ballpark station") may refer to the following train stations in Japan:

 Kyūjōmae Station (Kochi), in Aki, Kōchi
 Kyūjōmae Station (Okayama), in Kurashiki, Okayama
 Kiryū-Kyūjō-Mae Station, in Kiryū, Gunma
 Seibukyūjō-mae Station, in Tokorozawa, Saitama